Persian: چهار آسیاب Chahār Aasiāb
Char Asiab, Chahar Asiab, Charasiab, Charasiah or Charasia is a town, ca. 7 miles south of Kabul in the Char Asiab District.

It was the site of the Battle of Charasiab in 1879 and the Second Battle of Charasiab on 25 April 1880 during the Second Anglo-Afghan War.

References

Kabul Province